In college football, the Group of Five are five athletic conferences whose members are part of NCAA Division I Football Bowl Subdivision (FBS). The five conferences are the American Athletic Conference (American), Conference USA (C-USA), Mid-American Conference (MAC), Mountain West Conference (MW), and Sun Belt Conference (SBC or Sun Belt).

Division I football conferences
The Group of Five conferences are five of the ten conferences in NCAA Division I FBS. The other five FBS conferences are informally known as the Power Five. In addition, a number of schools compete in FBS as independents in football.

The terms Group of Five and Power Five are not formally defined by the National Collegiate Athletic Association (NCAA), and the precise origins of the terms are unknown. However, each of the ten conferences are named in the NCAA's Division I manual. A notable difference between the Group of Five and Power Five are designated areas of institutional autonomy granted to member institutions of the Power Five conferences.

The Group of Five is often considered disadvantaged as to the Power Five, as its constituent members do not have similar access to New Year's Six or College Football Playoff bowls. Since the BCS era, this has been an ongoing area of contention among NCAA Division I schools. In November 2012, agreement was reached to guarantee a spot in one of the New Year's Six bowl games to a team from one of the Group of Five conferences, beginning with the 2014 football season.

On December 5, 2021, Cincinnati became the first Group of Five team to make the College Football Playoff.

In sports other than football (mainly basketball), conferences outside of the Power Five are known as mid-major conferences.

Current conferences and teams
The ten current FBS conferences are listed below. For the Group of Five, the football members of each conference are also listed. Independent NCAA Division I FBS teams are listed in a third table. Tables reflect conference memberships as of the 2022 football season.

Power Five

Independents

Map of Group of Five teams

References